The FIDE World Cup 2000 was a 24-player Category XVI chess tournament played between 1 September and 13 September 2000 in Shenyang, China. The tournament was organized by FIDE, hosted by the Chinese Chess Association, and billed as the First Chess World Cup. Viswanathan Anand defeated Evgeny Bareev in the final to win the inaugural title and a $50,000 cash prize.

Format

The 24 players were split into four groups of six players each, with every player playing each other player in his group once. The top two finishers in each group were sent forward to the knockout stages, with ties being resolved by playoffs. From the quarterfinals onward, each knockout match consisted of two games, with ties being broken by a set of speed games.

Participants
All players are Grandmasters unless indicated otherwise.

 , 2762
 , 2756
 , 2719
 , 2702
 , 2689
 , 2681
 , 2677
 , 2676
 , 2673
 , 2670
 , 2668
 , 2667
 , 2667
 , 2666
 , 2657
 , 2646
 , 2643
 , 2636
 , 2633
 , 2630
 , 2620
 , 2591
 , 2350, IM
 , 2342, no title

Ratings are as per the July 2000 FIDE ratings list.

Calendar

Group stage

Nine out of the top 10 seeds finished the group stages with a plus or equal score – the lone exception, Alexander Morozevich, crashed out of the tournament with a single point in 5 games. The reigning FIDE World Champion Alexander Khalifman also suffered a disappointing showing, with losses to Anand and Gelfand. The dark horse of the tournament was 19th-seeded Gilberto Milos, a chess grandmaster from Brazil and five-time South American chess champion. Milos' upset win over Morozevich would propel him to the top of Group A, and eventually, into the semifinals of the World Cup. The top seed in each of the other groups advanced to the quarterfinals.

Playoffs
Anand, the tournament's hitherto-untroubled No. 1 seed, breezed through the quarterfinal round against his longtime rival Vassily Ivanchuk. But Boris Gelfand gave Anand a challenge in the semi-final, and the match was not settled until a sudden-death blitz game. In the other half of the bracket, Bareev dropped the first game but managed to win his quarterfinal match against Azmaiparashvili before facing a relentless Gilberto Milos in the semifinals. Bareev eventually edged past the Brazilian, drawing both classical games before winning the first rapid playoff thanks to a distressing blunder (79. Nd5??) from Milos that cost him his queen and the match.

Final

The first game of the World Cup final between Viswanathan Anand and Evgeny Bareev played out to a draw after 33 moves. In the second game, Anand – playing the white side of the French defence – sacrificed the exchange for two pawns to gain a slight advantage. But Bareev's fate was not sealed until 36... Re8?? - a shocking blunder that gave Anand a completely winning position.

References 

2000
2000 in chess
Chess in China
Sport in Shenyang
2000 in Chinese sport
International sports competitions hosted by China